Dr. Jose Rizal Park is a 9.6 acre (39,000 m²) park on the west slope of Beacon Hill in Seattle, Washington. The land, condemned by the city in 1917 for engineering purposes, was acquired by the Parks Department in 1971, and the park was dedicated eight years later. The park is named after José Rizal, national hero of the Philippines.

Rizal Park is bounded on the west by Interstate 5, on the north by Interstate 90, on the east by 12th Avenue S., and on the south by S. Judkins Street and the Jungle. The park consists of a grassy upper area with shelter and picnic tables, a wooded hillside, and an off-leash dog park at the foot of the hill.

History 
The land that would be Rizal Park was condemned by the city in 1917 for engineering purposes but was acquired by the Parks Department in 1971. In 1973, the Filipino Alumni Association petitioned the city to honor the Filipino nationalist José Rizal. The following year, the park was renamed to Dr. Jose Rizal Park and officially dedicated in 1981.

References

External links
City of Seattle Parks Department page

Beacon Hill, Seattle
Park
Parks in Seattle